Pseudoceto is a monotypic genus of South American long-legged sac spiders containing the single species, Pseudoceto pickeli. It was first described by Cândido Firmino de Mello-Leitão in 1929, and has only been found in Brazil. Originally placed with the Corinnidae, it was moved to the Miturgidae in 2014.

References

Miturgidae
Monotypic Araneomorphae genera
Taxa named by Cândido Firmino de Mello-Leitão
Spiders of Brazil